"Nightingale" is the 154th episode of Star Trek: Voyager, the eighth episode of the seventh season. This science fiction television show tells the story of the USS Voyager, a 24th century Starfleet vessel stranded on the wrong the side of the galaxy. Even with their faster-than-light warp drive, it will take several decades to get back.

In this episode, directed by LeVar Burton, the crew are caught in a conflict between two alien factions amidst their search for supplies, as they try to man their spacecraft. Harry Kim is in the spotlight as he takes command of an alien vessel, and Icheb navigates life aboard a starship.

Plot

Voyager sets down on a planet for a major maintenance overhaul while away teams in shuttles are sent in search of supplies. Harry Kim, Seven of Nine and Neelix, aboard the Delta Flyer, become caught in the crossfire between Kraylor and Annari ships. The Kraylor captain asks for the Flyers help as they are on a humanitarian mission, while the Annari continue their attack even after Kim contacts them. Kim orders the others to protect the Kraylor vessel with the Flyer, and cause the Annari to retreat.

Kim and the others transport to the Kraylor ship and find most of the command crew, including the captain, now dead. As they assist the ship's doctor Loken with the other crew, Loken asks for Kim's help to pilot their vessel back to their homeworld with their supply of necessary vaccines as none of the remaining crew have navigation experience and the Annari are still patrolling the sector. Kim agrees, recognizing they will pass near the planet where Voyager has set down, as well as desiring to show his abilities to command a vessel on his own. Kim works at teaching the acting helmsman Terek how to pilot the ship.

They use the ship's unreliable cloaking device to make it to the planet, where they see Voyager interacting with an Annari vessel. After the Annari leave, Kim takes Loken to Captain Janeway to explain the Kraylor's plight. Janeway admits that this leaves them in a difficult position as they have just completed negotiations with the Annari for repair materials, but allows Kim to continue taking the Kraylor home. Kim opts to name the ship Nightingale after the famous wartime nurse. They use the cloaking device to continue to evade the Annari, but the device fails just as they near a fleet of 6 Annari ships. Seven is unable to get the cloak restored, but suddenly Loken gives the crew several instructions for the cloaking device, quickly re-engaging it and allowing Kim to navigate their escape. Kim confronts Loken, who reveals that they are not carrying vaccines but instead are scientists and researchers that created this cloaking technology so they could smuggle supplies to their homeworld through an Annari blockade around their planet. Loken insists that their mission is still humanitarian, but Kim, realizing the severity of the situation, orders the ship to return to Voyager. Loken overrides him and has Terek maintain their heading towards the homeworld. Kim discusses the option of fleeing the ship via escape pods with Seven, but realizes he offered to help the Kraylor and stays onboard to help.

Meanwhile, the Annari contact Voyager again, after discovering the Starfleet personnel on board the Kraylor vessel. The Annari demand that Voyager leave their sector. The ship is escorted out of Annari space while still under impulse power.

As the Nightingale nears the Kraylor homeworld, they discover the Annari are scanning the area with technology that will detect the cloaked ship. Kim comes up with a plan, and allows the ship to be detected and caught in a tractor beam. Kim contacts the Annari and offers their surrender, ordering the remaining crew, except for himself, Seven, and Terek, to use the escape pods. As the other crew flee, Kim has Seven scan the Annari tractor beam to determine its frequency. Just before the Annari fire upon the empty ship, Kim has the ship's shields tuned to that frequency, causing the Nightingale to break free of the tractor beam and be repelled away from the blockade towards the planet. Terek pilots them safely to the surface, completing Kim's mission. Eventually Kim and Seven return to Voyager, with Kim unsure whether he is ready to take full command.

In a side plot, Icheb assists B'Elanna Torres with the repairs, and comes to learn about the nature of love and dating through a series of accidental missteps with Torres.

Production

Garrett Wang was pleased to be working with LeVar Burton, after being directed by him previously in the episode "Timeless". However, he later said in an interview with Starlog magazine that the script for the episode was originally going to write his character out of the series as he would have remained on the Kraylor vessel and only made a re-appearance in the series finale. Wang said that this would have been a "coup", as the cast get paid whether or not they appear in an episode and so he would have thought of it as a holiday.

The episode's teleplay was written by Andre Bormanis, with a story by Robert Lederman and Dave Long.

This episode was directed by Levar Burton, who directed several other episodes in this television series. Burton played Geordi La Forge, first appearing in the series Star Trek: The Next Generation and reprising that role in the episode "Timeless" which he also directed. Overall Burton would direct 8 episodes of this series.

Guest stars include :

 Manu Intiraymi as Icheb
 Beverly leech as Dayla
 Alan Brooks as Annari Commander
 Ron Glass as Loken
 Paul O'Brien as Geral
 Scott Miles as Terek
 Bob Rudd as Brell

Reception 
This episode was noted for Harry Kim in command of a starship.

Gender and Sexuality in Star Trek by David Greven, highlights Neelix's relationship with Harry Kim as a "midnight snack father confessor" nurturing other crew in his role as morale officer and cook.

Home media releases 
On December 21, 2003, this episode was released on DVD as part of a Season 7 boxset; Star Trek Voyager: Complete Seventh Season.

References

External links
 

Star Trek: Voyager (season 7) episodes
2000 American television episodes
Television episodes directed by LeVar Burton